Martian language, sometimes also called brain-disabled characters, is the nickname of unconventional representation of Chinese characters online. "Martian" describes that which seems strange to local culture. The term was popularised by a line from the 2001 Hong Kong comedy Shaolin Soccer, in which Sing (Stephen Chow) tells Mui (Zhao Wei): "Go back to Mars. The Earth is so dangerous."

In the 2006 General Scholastic Ability Test of Taiwan, students were asked to interpret symbols and phrases written in "Martian language" based on contexts written in standard language. Controversies which followed forced the testing center to abandon the practice in future exams.

In 2007, Martian language began to catch on in mainland China. The first adopters of Martian language mainly consisted of Post-90s netizens. They use it in their nicknames, short messages, and chat rooms in order to demonstrate personality differences. Later, they found that their teachers and parents could hardly figure out their new language, which quickly became their secret code to communicate with each other. Chinese online bloggers followed up the trend to use Martian language, because they found that their blog posts written in the new language can easily pass Internet censorship engines, which are currently based on text-matching techniques. The Martian language became so popular in cyberspace that software were created to translate between Chinese and Martian language.

General aspects

The Martian language is written from Chinese by means of various substitution methods. Just like in l33t, where the letter "e" is replaced by the number "3", in Martian, standard Chinese characters are replaced with nonstandard ones, or foreign scripts. Each Chinese character may be replaced with:
 A character that is a (quasi-)homophone
 A character that looks similar, such as one with a shared radical
 A character with the same or similar meaning
The character used for substitution can include not only Chinese characters, but also Latin script, Cyrillic, hiragana, bopomofo, katakana, the IPA, other unicode symbols, SMS language, etc. For example, the 星 in 火星文 huoxingwen (星 is literally "star"; 火星 is "Planet Mars") can be replaced by "☆", a Unicode symbol that visually represents an actual star. 的 is commonly replaced with の, as it has the same intended meaning in Japanese. 火 can become 吙 just by adding a 口 radical, which alters very little in terms of sound and visually maintains the 火 image, even though this changes the meaning. In the same principle, 文 wen (language) can be replaced with 魰 by adding a 鱼 fish radical, which makes the character still look similar. Also, 的 is sometimes replaced with "d" due to its sound, as with 比 being replaced with "b"; Cyrillic can be used in a similar manner. 

There is not a universal way of encoding standard Chinese to Martian language, though some substitutions are popular and have even leaked into the standard language and the spoken language, such as 河蟹 (lit. river crab) for 和諧 (harmony), 葉佩雯 (lit. leaf jade essay, also having the format of a person's name) for 業配文 (advertisement placement).

Example

Below is one example of the nearly infinite number of possible ways to substitute the Preamble of the Universal Declaration of Human Rights. Note that this is an extreme example, as it is uncommon to write entire paragraphs in Martian language.

Martian language 
鑑於薱朲蘱傢庭葰烠宬員啇懙笙椇婡旳繜嚴忣祺鮃等啇啝bú迻嘚權利ㄖㄅ承認，迺湜卋琾臫凷、㊣礒與龢鮃啇基礎，

鑑玗譵仌權菂憮眡龢衊眎魢導緻埜蠻曓珩，這些曓荇激怒孒仌蘱嘚哴惢，

鑒玗怼ー個亻亽亯絠唁轮啝ィ訁卬垍甴倂浼予恐懼龢匱乏d迣琾魡朌朢，巳陂鍹佈蒍普通秂泯dě樶縞願朢，

鑑玗儰駛亽頛вμ緻廹朩嘚巳鋌侕赱險濧曓政龢壓廹琎荇販頖，絠鉍楆鉂秂權綬琺治d褓鹱。

Traditional Chinese 

鑑於對人類家庭所有成員的與生俱來的尊嚴及其平等的和不移的權利的承認，乃是世界自由、正義與和平的基礎，

鑑於對人權的無視和蔑視已導致野蠻暴行，這些暴行激怒了人類的良心，

鑑於對一個人人享有言論和信仰自由並免予恐懼和匱乏的世界的盼望，已被宣佈為普通人民的最高願望，

鑑於為使人類不致迫不得已鋌而走險對暴政和壓迫進行反叛，有必要使人權受法治的保護。

Simplified Chinese 
鉴于对人类家庭所有成员的与生俱来的尊严及其平等的和不移的权利的承认，乃是世界自由、正义与和平的基础，

鉴于对人权的无视和蔑视已导致野蛮暴行，这些暴行激怒了人类的良心，

鉴于对一个人人享有言论和信仰自由并免予恐惧和匮乏的世界的盼望，已被宣布为普通人民的最高愿望，

鉴于为使人类不致迫不得已铤而走险对暴政和压迫进行反叛，有必要使人权受法治的保护。

Hanyu Pinyin 

Jiànyú duì rénlèi jiātíng suǒyǒu chéngyuán de yǔ shēng jù lái de zūnyán jí qí píngděng de hé bù yí de quánlì de chéngrèn, nǎi shì shìjiè zìyóu, zhèngyì yǔ hépíng de jīchǔ,

Jiànyú duì rénquán de wúshì hé mièshì yǐ dǎozhì yěmán bàoxíng, zhèxiē bàoxíng jīnùle rénlèi de liángxīn,

Jiànyú duì yīgè rén rén xiǎngyǒu yánlùn hé xìnyǎng zìyóu bìng miǎn yǔ kǒngjù hé kuìfá de shìjiè de pànwàng, yǐ bèi xuānbù wèi pǔtōng rénmín de zuìgāo yuànwàng,

Jiànyú wèi shǐ rénlèi bùzhì pòbùdéyǐ dìng'érzǒuxiǎn duì bàozhèng hé yāpò jìnxíng fǎnpàn, yǒu bìyào shǐ rénquán shòu fǎzhì de bǎohù.

English translation 
Whereas recognition of the inherent dignity and of the equal and inalienable rights of all members of the human family is the foundation of freedom, justice and peace in the world,

Whereas disregard and contempt for human rights have resulted in barbarous acts which have outraged the conscience of mankind, and the advent of a world in which human beings shall enjoy freedom of speech and belief and freedom from fear and want has been proclaimed as the highest aspiration of the common people,

Whereas it is essential, if man is not to be compelled to have recourse, as a last resort, to rebellion against tyranny and oppression, that human rights should be protected by the rule of law,

Whereas it is essential to promote the development of friendly relations between nations...

See also
 Education in the Republic of China
 Faux Cyrillic
 Gibberish
 Gyaru-moji
 Heavy metal umlaut
 Internet slang
 Leet
 Mojibake
 Orz

References

External links
 Martian Script Translator

Internet culture
Chinese characters